Rubén García Martínez (born 6 December 1981) is a Spanish footballer who plays for CD Barco as a central midfielder.

Club career
Born in O Barco de Valdeorras, Province of Ourense, García finished his youth career with Racing de Santander, and made his senior debut with the reserves in the 2000–01 season, in Segunda División B. After a loan spell with Gimnástica de Torrelavega he returned to the former, and on 19 July 2003 he played his first match as a professional, coming on as a first-half substitute in a 0–1 home loss against FC Slovan Liberec for that year's UEFA Intertoto Cup.

In summer 2004, García joined Zamora CF also on loan. Two years later he signed with SD Eibar, in the same situation and still in the third level.

García was released by Racing in 2007 and continued to compete in that tier, representing CD Puertollano, Cultural y Deportiva Leonesa (two stints), Real Oviedo, Real Unión, CD Lugo, UD Logroñés, UD Salamanca and SD Noja.

References

External links
 
 
 
 

1981 births
Living people
Spanish footballers
Footballers from Galicia (Spain)
Association football midfielders
Segunda División B players
Tercera División players
Rayo Cantabria players
Racing de Santander players
Gimnástica de Torrelavega footballers
Zamora CF footballers
SD Eibar footballers
CD Puertollano footballers
Cultural Leonesa footballers
Real Oviedo players
Real Unión footballers
CD Lugo players
UD Logroñés players
UD Salamanca players